The Innoko River ((Deg Xinag: Yooniq) is a  tributary of the Yukon River in the U.S. state of Alaska. It flows north from its origin south of Cloudy Mountain in the Kuskokwim Mountains and then southwest to meet the larger river across from Holy Cross.

Most of its upper portion flows through the Innoko National Wildlife Refuge. The entire river is within the Yukon–Koyukuk Census Area.

Innoko is a Deg Hit’an name for the river. The Russian colonial administrators also called the river Shiltonotno, Legon or Tlegon, Chagelyuk or Shageluk and Ittege at various times in the 19th century.

See also
List of rivers of Alaska

References

External links

Rivers of Alaska
Rivers of Yukon–Koyukuk Census Area, Alaska
Tributaries of the Yukon River
Rivers of Unorganized Borough, Alaska